To Rithya (born 10 October 1967) is a Cambodian long-distance runner. He competed in the men's marathon at the 1996 Summer Olympics and the 2000 Summer Olympics.

References

External links
 

1967 births
Living people
Athletes (track and field) at the 1996 Summer Olympics
Athletes (track and field) at the 2000 Summer Olympics
Cambodian male long-distance runners
Cambodian male marathon runners
Olympic athletes of Cambodia
Place of birth missing (living people)
Olympic male marathon runners